Calabasas High School is a four-year high school in Calabasas, California, United States.

Calabasas High School, which serves Calabasas and portions of West Hills, Los Angeles, is one of three high schools in the Las Virgenes Unified School District (along with Agoura High School and Indian Hills High School in Agoura Hills).

As of the 2014–15 school year, the school had an enrollment of 1,824 students and 65.4 classroom teachers (on an FTE basis), for a student–teacher ratio of 27.9:1. There were 103 students (5.6% of enrollment) eligible for free lunch and 26 (1.4% of students) eligible for reduced-cost lunch.

History

Calabasas High School was established in 1975 as the second high school in the Las Virgenes Unified School District.

During the 2006–07 school year Calabasas High School was recognized with the Blue Ribbon School Award of Excellence by the United States Department of Education, the highest award the Department of Education gives.

The school plays its football games at Keith Ritchie Field, an open-air stadium located in Calabasas, California, with a capacity of approximately 3,000. The stadium is the home of the Coyotes – Calabasas High School's football, track and field and soccer teams. It was also formerly the home field for the USL Premier Development League club, the San Fernando Valley Quakes.

The Calabasas High School Theater Program performs in the Performing Arts Education Center. The center opened in 2013. The $18 million building was funded through Measure G, which passed in 2006. The Performing Arts Education Center was designed by architect John Sergio Fisher. The mainstage theater seats 680 people. There is a black box theater in the facility that seats 100 people. The Performing Arts Education Center has won numerous design awards, including a 2012 AIA / SFV Award for Design Excellence and a 2011 Los Angeles Business Council Architectural Award.

Notable alumni
 Shiri Appleby (born 1978), actress known for her roles in Swimfan, Roswell, and UnReal
 Ezra Butler (born 1984), professional football player
 Katie Cassidy (born 1986), actress
 Omer Fedi (born 2000), Israeli guitarist, songwriter and producer
 Michelle Fields (born 1988), Fox News reporter
 Amanda Fink (born 1986, class of 2005), tennis player
 Danielle Fishel (born 1981, class of 1999), actress
 Gaby Hoffmann (born 1982), actress
Darnay Holmes (born 1998), professional football player with the New York Giants
 Incubus: Brandon Boyd, Mike Einziger, Jose Pasillas and formerly Dirk Lance 
 Jensen Karp (born 1979), author, rapper, television writer
 Ethan Josh Lee (born 2001), actor 
 Julia Lester (born 2000), actress
 Erik Menendez (born 1970), of the Menendez brothers, convicted of killing their parents
 Jim Rome (born 1964, class of 1982), television and radio host
 Ricky Schroder (born 1970), actor
 Daniel Steres (born 1990), professional soccer player with the LA Galaxy

References

External links
 

1975 establishments in California
Calabasas, California
Educational institutions established in 1975
High schools in Los Angeles County, California
High schools in the San Fernando Valley
Mulholland Highway
Public high schools in California